Licuala peltata is a species of palm tree in the family Arecaceae. It is found in South Asia and Southeast Asia.

Varieties
Licuala peltata var. sumawongii, found in Malaysia and southern Thailand
Licuala peltata var. peltata, found in South and Southeast Asia

Gallery
Licuala peltata var. sumawongii

References

peltata
Flora of Malaya
Flora of Thailand